Moritasgus is a monotypic genus of phasmids belonging to the family Diapheromeridae. The only species is Moritasgus stresemanni from Sulawesi.

References

Diapheromeridae